Klemzig may refer to:

Klemzig, German name for Klępsk, Poland, previously a Prussian village
Klemzig, South Australia, a suburb of Adelaide named after the Prussian village